was a Japanese swordsmith and was especially famous for making Tantō. He is the founder of the Soshu-den tradition. Usually he used suguha Hamon. The oldest date of his work is 1293. He was active during the Einin, Shōwa and Enkyō periods, generally acknowledged to be the teacher of master swordsmiths Masamune, Yukiimitsu and Norishige. This is due to various similarities in style and workmanship that indicate that Masamune was almost certainly his student.

An example of his work is known as 'Aizu Shintogo'. It is a tanto of 25.4 centimeters in length.

He had several sons, who likely crafted a number of swords under his name.

References

 "Token Bijutsu" Nihon Koto Shi (History of Koto) by Dr. Honma Junji
Book: Japanese Swords by Nobuo Ogasawara (tenth edition, printed 1986)

Japanese swordsmiths
Year of birth missing
Year of death missing